Youssef Gamal is an Egyptian Football striker who plays for Egyptian Premier League side El Geish. He joined El Geish in July 2010 as he penned a two-seasons contract.

References

External links
 Youssef Gamal at footmercato.

1984 births
Living people
Egyptian footballers
Ismaily SC players
Egyptian Premier League players
Association football forwards